This is a list of people who have served as Lord-Lieutenant of Westmorland. The office was abolished on 31 March 1974 and replaced by the Lord Lieutenant of Cumbria. From 1751 to 1974, all Lord Lieutenants were also Custos Rotulorum of Westmorland.

Henry Clifford, 2nd Earl of Cumberland 1553–1559
Henry Hastings, 3rd Earl of Huntingdon 20 August 1586 – 14 December 1595
vacant?
George Clifford, 3rd Earl of Cumberland 1603–1605
vacant?
Francis Clifford, 4th Earl of Cumberland 27 October 1607 – 4 January 1641 jointly with
George Home, 1st Earl of Dunbar 27 October 1607 – 20 January 1611 and
Theophilus Howard, 2nd Earl of Suffolk 27 October 1607 – 31 August 1639 and
Henry Clifford, 1st Baron Clifford 27 October 1607 – 1642 and
Algernon Percy, 10th Earl of Northumberland 13 November 1626 – 31 August 1639 and
Thomas Howard, 21st Earl of Arundel 23 July 1632 – 31 August 1639 and
Henry Howard, Lord Maltravers 23 July 1632 – 31 August 1639
Interregnum
Charles Howard, 1st Earl of Carlisle 1 October 1660 – 24 February 1685
Thomas Tufton, 6th Earl of Thanet 3 March 1685 – 1687
Richard Graham, 1st Viscount Preston 29 August 1687 – 1688
Sir John Lowther, 2nd Baronet 8 April 1689 – 1694
Charles Howard, 3rd Earl of Carlisle 28 June 1694 – 1 May 1738
Henry Lowther, 3rd Viscount Lonsdale 1 June 1738 – 7 March 1751
vacant
Sir William Lowther, 3rd Baronet 6 February 1753 – 15 April 1756
Sir John Pennington, 3rd Baronet 29 April 1756 – 1758
James Lowther, 1st Earl of Lonsdale 13 December 1759 – 24 May 1802
William Lowther, 1st Earl of Lonsdale 26 June 1802 – 19 March 1844
William Lowther, 2nd Earl of Lonsdale 3 May 1844 – 1868
Henry Lowther, 3rd Earl of Lonsdale 14 December 1868 – 15 August 1876
Sir Richard Musgrave, 11th Baronet 3 October 1876 – 13 February 1881
Henry Tufton, 1st Baron Hothfield 15 March 1881 – 29 October 1926
Lord Henry Cavendish-Bentinck 8 December 1926 – 6 October 1931
Stanley Hughes le Fleming 7 December 1931 – 1939
Anthony Lowther, Viscount Lowther 1 December 1939 – 1945
James Winstanley Cropper 26 April 1945 – 10 November 1956
Henry Hornyold-Strickland 6 May 1957 – 1965
Lieutenant-Commander Paul Norman Wilson 12 November 1965 – 31 March 1974

References
 

Westmorland
History of Westmorland
 
1974 disestablishments in England